The 2019 Rutgers Scarlet Knights football team represented Rutgers University during the 2019 NCAA Division I FBS football season. The Scarlet Knights played their home games at SHI Stadium in Piscataway, New Jersey and competed as members of the East Division of the Big Ten Conference. They were led by fourth-year head coach Chris Ash. On September 29, 2019, Ash was fired after 3 seasons as head coach. He posted an overall record of 8–32 and 3–26 in Big Ten play. Nunzio Campanile was their interim head coach for the remainder of the season. They finished the season 2–10, 0–9 in Big Ten play to finish in last place in the East Division.

Previous season
The Scarlet Knights finished the 2018 season 1–11, 0–9 in Big Ten play to finish in last place in the East Division.

Offseason
Andy Buh was hired as defensive coordinator on January 21, 2019. He had previously served in the same position for three years at Maryland. Henry Baker, who served as cornerbacks coach for Rutgers in 2017 but coached at North Carolina in 2018, was hired back as cornerbacks coach and passing game coordinator.

Preseason

Preseason Big Ten poll
Although the Big Ten Conference has not held an official preseason poll since 2010, Cleveland.com has polled sports journalists representing all member schools as a de facto preseason media poll since 2011. For the 2019 poll, Rutgers was projected to finish in last in the East Division.

Schedule
Rutgers' 2019 schedule began on August 30 with a non-conference game against UMass, a football independent. The Scarlet Knights' other non-conference games were against Boston College of the Atlantic Coast Conference and Liberty, also an independent at the time. In Big Ten Conference play, Rutgers played all members of the East Division as well as Iowa, Minnesota, and Illinois from the West Division.

Source:

Game summaries

UMass

at Iowa

Boston College

at Michigan

Maryland

at Indiana

Minnesota

Liberty

at Illinois

Ohio State

Michigan State

at Penn State

Roster and Coaches

References

Rutgers
Rutgers Scarlet Knights football seasons
Rutgers Scarlet Knights football